Nasi bakar (Indonesian for "burned or grilled rice") refer to steamed rice seasoned with spices and ingredients and wrapped in banana leaf secured with lidi semat (small needle made of central rib of coconut leaf) and later grilled upon charcoal fire. The burned banana leaf produced a unique aroma upon the rice. The banana leaf package is opened upon consumption. It is a relatively newly developed Indonesian dish around the early 2000s, probably derived from nasi timbel rice wrapped in banana leaf. (Source?)

There are many variants of nasi bakar according to its ingredients, such as fried chicken, empal gepuk (fried beef), anchovy, peda fish, milkfish, salted fish, shrimp, mushroom, tempeh, tofu, salted duck egg etc.

Gallery

See also 

Nasi liwet
Nasi timbel
Nasi uduk
Nasi bogana
Nasi lemak

References

External links

Indonesian rice dishes
Banana leaf